Luis Pérez (born 12 September 1957) is a Colombian former footballer. He competed in the men's tournament at the 1980 Summer Olympics.

References

External links
 
 

1957 births
Living people
Colombian footballers
Colombia international footballers
Olympic footballers of Colombia
Footballers at the 1980 Summer Olympics
People from Santa Marta
Association football forwards
Sportspeople from Magdalena Department
Unión Magdalena footballers